Edward Duncan Stoney (31 July 1868 – 8 February 1898) was a Victorian era Irish engineer, noted for his work on sluices.

Early life and education
Edward Duncan Stoney was born on 31 July 1868 at Dundalk, the son of Francis Goold Morony Stoney and Annie Elizabeth Duncan (1843-1923).

Career
Edward was a civil engineer living at Tumbricane, Ipswich in 1894 and working for Ransomes & Rapier. He was elected as an associate member of the Institute of Civil Engineers on 4 Dec 1894

Family
He married Ellen Naomi Pope (1869-1964) eldest daughter of George Harrison Pope and Naomi Cox in July 1892. They had one son Francis George Duncan Stoney (1893-1916) and two daughters Catherine Ruth Stoney (1894-1984) and Margaret Naomi Stoney (1897-1983). Edward died of Pleurisy at Ipswich on 8 February 1898, aged 29.

References

Irish civil engineers
1868 births
1898 deaths